Francis "Pug" Lund (April 18, 1913 – May 26, 1994) was an American football player.  Lund was born in Rice Lake, Wisconsin and attended Rice Lake High School. 

As a Minnesota Gopher halfback, Lund was named All-Conference in both 1933 and in 1934, when he was the conference MVP.  He was a consensus All-American in 1934.  "Pug" Lund was elected to the College Football Hall of Fame in 1958.

References

External links

1913 births
1994 deaths
American football fullbacks
Minnesota Golden Gophers football coaches
Minnesota Golden Gophers football players
All-American college football players
College Football Hall of Fame inductees
People from Rice Lake, Wisconsin
Players of American football from Wisconsin